Katawan is a 1999 Philippine thriller drama film directed by Abbo dela Cruz. The film stars Christopher de Leon and Rosanna Roces, who co-wrote the story. This is the last film produced by Neo Films before being absorbed into its parent company Viva Films.

Cast
 Christopher de Leon as Carlo
 Rosanna Roces as Carmen
 Bobby Andrews as Andres
 Leandro Baldemor as David
 Dindi Gallardo as Jackie
 Daniella as Delia
 Alicia Lane as Lagring
 Alicia Alonzo as Hermana Tuding
 Tony Mabesa as Don Villaverde
 Lora Luna as Donya Francesca
 Ama Quiambao as Inang Chayong
 Dante Castro as Contractor
 Jessel Jimenez as Delia's Lover
 Archie Ventosa as Dr. Froi
 Abbo dela Cruz as Clerk
 Jun Cudia as Gasoline Boy

References

External links

1999 films
1999 thriller films
Filipino-language films
Philippine thriller drama films
Neo Films films